Seletar is an area located in the north-east of Singapore. Its name can also refer to the Seletar Planning Area (as defined by the Urban Redevelopment Authority), situated in the North-East Region of Singapore. The place name was derived from the Malay subgroup who were indigenous to the area, the Orang Seletar. It shares boundaries with the planning areas of Sengkang to the south, Punggol to the east, Yishun and Simpang to the west, as well as the Straits of Johor to the north.

Formerly Royal Air Force Station Seletar Royal Air Force military airfield site, the area now houses a new S$60 million Seletar Aerospace Park that spans 140 hectares. The aerospace park houses industries specialising in aircraft maintenance and repair services. There are future plans to transform Seletar into one of the Singapore's regional centres, along with Jurong East, Tampines and Woodlands. Once the transformation is complete, Seletar will be known as the only regional centre without a single MRT line passing through it, unlike its other regional rivals who have multiple MRT lines. The recent introduction of newer residential property and retail malls, most notably Greenwich V and Seletar Mall, Parc Botannia at Fernvale, Luxus Hill, Belgravia Ace and Parc Greenwich has served well in rejuvenating the Seletar area, with further plans to increase BTO flats supply in the area serve to create additional housing options for people working in the Aerospace Park.

Geography

Geographical extent
According to the book Down the Seletar River: Discovering a Hidden Treasure of Singapore, Seletar generally refers to a region defined by the Ponggol River to the east, the Seletar River to the west, Ang Mo Kio to the south and the Straits of Johore to the north. It includes the areas covering Yio Chu Kang, Jalan Kayu, Lower Seletar Reservoir and a part of Upper Thomson.

Seletar Planning Area
Seletar Planning Area, as defined by the Urban Redevelopment Authority, shares a land boundary with planning areas of Sengkang to the south, riverine boundaries with Punggol to the east and Yishun to the west. Its northern boundary is made up by the Straits of Johor. Seletar Planning Area is officially divided into 4 subzones – Seletar, Seletar Aerospace Park, Pulau Punggol Barat and Pulau Punggol Timor.

History
The area was home to the indigenous Malay population, especially the Orang Seletar (Malay for Seletar people) - a subgroup of Malay sea gypsies living on the waters of the island. There were already hundreds of them even before the arrival of Raffles. Seletar was originally a rubber plantation estate owned and managed by the Singapore United Rubber Plantations Ltd. In 1923, the Straits Settlement government bought  from the Singapore United Rubber Plantations Ltd and gave it to the British Royal Air Force as a site for its military air base in Singapore. Construction of the airfield was completed in 1929 and it was officially opened in 1930. The airfield was the first RAF base east of India and had also served as a civilian airport until 1937, when Kallang Airport was opened to the public.

The Seletar Reservoir (now known as Upper Seletar Reservoir), was first built in 1920, after the First World War to cope with the water demand in Singapore. It was marked as a conservation site in August 1999.

The area is also dotted with colonial bungalows that were built for the military personnel of the RAF, which still stands today. In 2007, the government announced that some 174 bungalows has been set aside for demolition to make way for the new Seletar Aerospace Park, while the remaining 204 bungalows will be retained and some of these units will be converted into aerospace training schools and food and beverage outlets, while 131 units will be set aside for residential use.

See also
Seletar Airport
Belgravia Ace

References

Sources
Victor R Savage, Brenda S A Yeoh (2003), Toponymics – A Study of Singapore Street Names, Eastern Universities Press, 

 
Places in Singapore
North-East Region, Singapore